Gertrud Heinzelmann (1914–1999), was a Swiss feminist and suffragist, a leading figure in the Swiss women suffrage movement. She was a member of the women suffrage union Schweizerischen Verbandes für Frauenrechte, and its president in 1959–1960.

In 2001 Gertrud Heinzelmann's work was honoured by the Gesellschaft zu Fraumünster.

Notes

1914 births
1999 deaths
Swiss suffragists
Swiss Roman Catholics
Swiss feminists